Walter Mathä (born September 25, 1914, date of death unknown) is an Austrian boxer who competed in the 1936 Summer Olympics. In 1936 he was eliminated in the second round of the bantamweight class after losing his fight to Stig Cederberg.

External links
Walter Mathä's profile at Sports Reference.com

1914 births
Year of death missing
Bantamweight boxers
Olympic boxers of Austria
Boxers at the 1936 Summer Olympics
Austrian male boxers